Huang Liping (born January 1972 in Wuhan, Hubei, China) is a gymnastics magistrate and former Chinese gymnast.

Competitive career
Huang started as an amateur in 1978, joining the Hubei team in 1985, and was selected to China's national gymnastics team the following year. He won gold medals in the team all-around, individual all-around, high bar and parallel bars at the 1993 National Gymnastics Games, and went on to win several medals at the World Artistic Gymnastics Championships. At the 1996 Summer Olympics in Atlanta, he won a silver medal with the Chinese team and finished sixth on the parallel bars.

Retirement
Retiring after the 1996 games, Huang became the youngest world-class gymnastics magistrate in China. In 1998, he was named the Chinese national gymnastics coach, replacing Li Ning in that position.

Beijing 2008
At the 2008 Summer Olympics in Beijing, Huang took the Olympic Oath for judges at the Beijing National Stadium during the Opening Ceremonies.

References
 Wallechinsky, David and Jaime Loucky (2008). "Gymnastics (Men)". In The Complete Book of the Olympics: 2008 Edition. London: Aurum Press, Limited. pp. 682, 699.

External links
Huan Liping(Parallel bars)

1972 births
Living people
Chinese male artistic gymnasts
Gymnasts at the 1996 Summer Olympics
Olympic gymnasts of China
Olympic medalists in gymnastics
Olympic officials
Sportspeople from Wuhan
Asian Games medalists in gymnastics
Gymnasts at the 1994 Asian Games
Asian Games gold medalists for China
Asian Games silver medalists for China
Medalists at the 1994 Asian Games
Medalists at the 1996 Summer Olympics
Medalists at the World Artistic Gymnastics Championships
Olympic silver medalists for China
Oath takers at the Olympic Games
Gymnasts from Hubei
20th-century Chinese people